The Boston College–Virginia Tech football rivalry is an American college football rivalry between the Boston College Eagles and Virginia Tech Hokies.

History
The rivalry began in 1993 with a 48–34 Boston College win in Chestnut Hill when the two teams began Big East conference round-robin play. When the two schools moved to the Atlantic Coast Conference the rivalry continued as the two schools were chosen as permanent cross-divisional rivals. The teams played twice in one season in both 2007 and 2008, as Boston College won the Atlantic division of the ACC in each of those years and Virginia Tech won the Coastal division. Although the Eagles defeated the Hokies in both the regular seasons of 2007 and 2008, Virginia Tech won the 2007 and 2008 ACC Championship Game played between the two schools. Virginia Tech leads the series 19–11.

Game results

See also 
 List of NCAA college football rivalry games

References

Further reading
Rivalry Blooming Between Hokies, Eagles, The Washington Post, October 16, 2008.

Boston College Eagles football
Virginia Tech Hokies football
College football rivalries in the United States